= Genesee County Sheriff's Office =

Genesee County Sheriff's Office may refer to:

- Genesee County Sheriff's Office (Michigan)
- Genesee County Sheriff's Office (New York)
